Katherine Alexis Biberdorf (née Crawford), also known as Kate the Chemist is a popular science communicator and Associate Professor of Chemistry at the University of Texas at Austin. She serves as Director of Demonstrations and Outreach in the College of Natural Sciences.

Early life and education 
Biberdorf was born in Kalamazoo, Michigan. She became interested in chemistry whilst at high school, and her mother encouraged her to try out different experiments at home. She enjoyed watching Bill Nye the Science Guy and wanted to become the United States' next television scientist.

Biberdorf earned her undergraduate degree at the University of Michigan, where she majored in chemistry and German. Biberdorf completed her doctorate in inorganic chemistry at the University of Texas at Austin (UT Austin) in 2014. Her research considered heterogeneous catalysis for Suzuki-Miyaura coupling. She became involved with undergraduate teaching, and enjoyed getting young people excited about chemistry. She joined the teaching faculty at UT Austin in 2014 after completing her PhD.

Career 
At the University of Texas at Austin Biberdorf serves as Director of Demonstrations and Outreach in the College of Natural Sciences. She teaches general chemistry and scientific literacy to classes of five hundred students. After a few months, she created the program Fun with Chemistry, which introduces elementary, middle and high school students to chemistry experiments. The program reaches more than 20,000 students every year.

Outside of her teaching role at the University of Texas at Austin, Biberdorf is active in public engagement and science communication. She created a series of chemistry shows called the Puking Pumpkin Tour, which she performed at the USA Science and Engineering Festival. She has presented a science show at the Simmons University Leadership Conference.

Biberdorf delivered a TEDxDetroit Creating a STEM Army of Women in 2018. That year, she was selected by BuzzFeed as one of the world's top women scientists and was included in Amy Poehler's Smart Girls. She is regularly featured in the media, including on Great Big Story, The Wall Street Journal, the Today show, The Late Show with Stephen Colbert, the Wendy Williams show and CBS.

Biberdorf is writing a series of children's science books with Penguin Random House. The "Kate the Chemist" fiction series explore the activities of Kate, a ten year old who uses her understanding of science and technology to solve problems in her everyday life. Kate the Chemist: The Big Book of Experiments includes science experiments for children to try at home.

References 

Science communicators
American science writers
University of Texas at Austin faculty
University of Texas at Austin alumni
People from Kalamazoo, Michigan
American women chemists
Year of birth missing (living people)
Living people
University of Michigan alumni
American women academics
21st-century American women